Klatka may refer to the following places:
Klatka, Greater Poland Voivodeship (west-central Poland)
Klatka, Łódź Voivodeship (central Poland)
Klatka, Podlaskie Voivodeship (north-east Poland)